Minsk–Kaliningrad Interconnection is a natural gas pipeline interconnection between Kaliningrad Oblast of Russia, Lithuania and Belarus. Currently it is the only pipeline supplying natural gas to Kaliningrad Oblast.

Lithuania has a contract with Gazprom on gas transit to Kaliningrad via pipeline until 2025.

History 
In 2005, Gazprom built the Krasnoznamenskaya compressor station.

In 2009 second line of the pipeline was finished, which allowed to expand maximum discharge up to 2.5 billion cubic metres annually.

In 2016, a 25 km gas pipeline branch to Chernyakhovsk and an automated gas distribution station put into service.

In October 2017, Gazprom completed the construction of two gas pipeline branches stretching to the towns of Gusev and Sovetsk.

In April 2022 President of Lithuania Gitanas Nausėda announced that Lithuanian national gas transmission operator Amber Grid and Lithuania has completely stopped purchasing the Russian gas and the transmission system has been operating without Russian gas imports since the beginning of April with no intention to receive the Russian gas in the future via Minsk–Kaliningrad Interconnection.

Connection to Jonava 
In 2019 Amber Grid renovated gas distribution station in Jonava, Lithuania. In October 2021 proposed reconstruction project for Jonava link released.

See also 
 Gas Interconnection Poland–Lithuania
 Lithuania–Latvia Interconnection

References 

Natural gas pipelines in Lithuania
Natural gas pipelines in Belarus
Natural gas pipelines in Russia